This article lists all the confirmed national football squads for the UEFA Women's Euro 1995.

Players marked (c) were named as captain for their national squad.

Head coach:  Ted Copeland

Head coach:  Gero Bisanz

Head coach:  Even Pellerud

Head coach:  Bengt Simonson

Sweden caps and goals based on compilation of match reports at https://www.svenskfotboll.se/landslag/dam/landskamper-1973-2000/
Source: Swedish Football Association

References

External links
 1995 - Match Details at RSSSF.com

1995
UEFA Women's Euro 1995